Dawid Dzięgielewski (born 24 April 1993) is a Polish footballer who plays as a midfielder for Legia Warsaw II. He formerly played for MKS Kutno, GKS Tychy, Pogoń Siedlce, GKS Bełchatów, Motor Lublin, Górnik Łęczna and Unia Skierniewice.

Career
Dzięgielewski began his career at Unia Skierniewice. In March 2008, he moved to Legia Warszawa, playing for the club's youth team. In October 2009, he received call up to the Poland Under 17 squad. In August 2011, he joined III liga side MKS Kutno, where he played until the end of the 2012–13 season.

In July 2013, Dzięgielewski signed a one-and-a-half year contract with I liga club GKS Tychy. He made his professional debut on 28 July 2013 in a 2–0 home win against Górnik Łęczna, coming on as a substitute in the 74th minute. He scored his first ever professional career goal in a 1–1 away draw with Stomil Olsztyn on 28 September 2013.

On 21 August 2014, it was announced that Dzięgielewski had signed with I liga side Pogoń Siedlce. He left the club at the end of the 2015–16 season, having made 45 league appearances, and scoring 4 goals. In August 2016, he signed one-year contract with GKS Bełchatów.

On 12 July 2017, Dzięgielewski moved to III liga club Motor Lublin. On 18 July 2018, he signed a contract with Górnik Łęczna.

References

External links
 

1993 births
GKS Tychy players
MKP Pogoń Siedlce players
GKS Bełchatów players
Motor Lublin players
Górnik Łęczna players
Legia Warsaw II players
I liga players
III liga players
Living people
Polish footballers
People from Skierniewice
Association football midfielders